St. Mary's Academy may refer to:

Canada
 St. Mary's Academy (Winnipeg, Manitoba)
 St. Mary's Academy (Edmundston, New Brunswick)

India
 St. Mary's Academy, Meerut

Philippines
 St. Mary's Academy of Pasay
 St. Mary's Academy of Caloocan City
 St. Mary's Academy of Carmen
 St. Mary's Academy of Kidapawan
 St. Mary's College of Meycauayan
 St. Mary's College of Quezon City

United Kingdom
 St Mary's Catholic Academy, Blackpool, Lancashire

United States

Schools
 St. Mary's Academy (Inglewood, California)
 St. Mary's Academy (Cherry Hills Village), Colorado
 Saint Mary's Academy and College, St. Marys, Kansas
 St. Mary's Academy (New Orleans, Louisiana)
 St. Mary's Academy (Portland, Oregon)
 St. Mary Academy – Bay View, East Providence, Rhode Island

Historic sites
 St. Mary's Academy (Davenport, Iowa), listed on the National Register of Historic Places (NRHP)
 St. Mary's - St. Alphonsus Regional Catholic School, Glens Falls, New York, also known and NRHP-listed as St. Mary's Academy
 St. Mary's Academy (Devils Lake, North Dakota), NRHP-listed
 Saint Mary's Academy Building, Pittsburgh, Pennsylvania
St. Mary's Academy Historic District (Monroe, Michigan)
St. Mary's Academy Historic District (Silver City, New Mexico), listed on the National Register of Historic Places in Grant County, New Mexico

See also
St. Mary's School (disambiguation)
Saint Mary's University (disambiguation)
Saint Mary's College (disambiguation)